Lycée René Descartes is a senior high school in Champs-sur-Marne, France, in the Paris metropolitan area.

 the school has 731 students.

References

External links
 Lycée René Descartes 

Lycées in Seine-et-Marne
Lycées in Marne-la-Vallée